Cimarex Energy Co. was a company engaged in hydrocarbon exploration, particularly shale oil and gas drilling. It was organized in Delaware and headquartered in Denver, Colorado, with operations primarily in Texas, Oklahoma, and New Mexico.

As of December 31, 2020, the company had  of estimated proved reserves, of which 43% was natural gas, 27% was petroleum, and 30% was natural gas liquids.

History
Cimarex was founded in 2002. The company was a corporate spin-off of Helmerich & Payne, which sought to separate its exploration and production business from its drilling business. In September 2002, shareholders of Helmerich & Payne received shares in Cimarex.

In 2005, the company acquired Magnum Hunter Resources in a $2.1 billion transaction.

In 2008, the company bought 38,000 acres in Oklahoma from Chesapeake Energy for $180 million.

In 2012, the company sold assets in Texas for $294 million.

In 2014, Cimarex acquired assets in the Cana-Woodford, including 140 billion cubic feet equivalent of proved reserves and 50,000 net acres, in a $249 million transaction.

In 2018, the company sold assets in Ward County, Texas for $570 million.

In March 2019, the company acquired Resolute Energy for $1.6 billion.

In October 2021, the company was acquired by Cabot Oil & Gas, forming Coterra.

References

External links

2002 establishments in Colorado
2021 mergers and acquisitions
Companies formerly listed on the New York Stock Exchange
Corporate spin-offs
Energy companies established in 2002
Non-renewable resource companies established in 2002